The Iowa–Minnesota football rivalry is an American college football rivalry between the Iowa Hawkeyes football team of the University of Iowa and Minnesota Golden Gophers football team of the University of Minnesota. Floyd of Rosedale, introduced in 1935, is a bronze trophy in the shape of a pig which is awarded to the winner of the game.

History

The 1934 game between the Hawkeyes and Golden Gophers had been filled with controversy over the treatment of Iowa star halfback Ozzie Simmons. Simmons was also one of the few black football players of that era, and several rough hits by the Gophers on Simmons forced him to leave the game multiple times in Minnesota’s 48–12 victory. “What it amounted to was that they were piling on – late hits,” Simmons recalled. “I had bruised ribs...they came at me with knees high, and some of it was pretty obvious.”

The following year, Coach Bernie Bierman’s Gophers were 5–0, and Coach Ossie Solem’s Hawkeyes were 4–0–1. Before the 1935 Iowa–Minnesota contest in Iowa City, Bierman received a flood of threatening letters from Iowa fans. He requested and received special police protection for the team when it detrained in Iowa a couple of  days before the contest.

The day before the game, Iowa Governor Clyde L. Herring told reporters, "If the officials stand for any rough tactics like Minnesota used last year, I'm sure the crowd won't." Herring’s message was clear. “What he was saying was, ‘If you treat Ozzie like you treated him last year, we’re coming out of the stands,’” Simmons said.

The news quickly reached Minnesota. Coach Bierman threatened to break off athletic relations. Minnesota Attorney General Harry H. Peterson practically accused the Iowa governor of thuggery. "Your remark that the crowd at the Iowa–Minnesota game will not stand for any rough tactics is calculated to incite a riot," said Peterson. "It is a breach of your duty as governor, and evidences an unsportsmanlike, cowardly and contemptible frame of mind."

To lighten the mood, Minnesota Governor Floyd Olson sent a telegram to Governor Herring on game-day morning, which read, "Minnesota folks are excited over your statement about Iowa crowds lynching the Minnesota football team. I have assured them you are law abiding gentlemen and are only trying to get our goat...I will bet you a Minnesota prize hog against an Iowa prize hog that Minnesota wins."

The Iowa governor accepted, and word of the bet reached Iowa City as the crowd gathered at the stadium. The situation calmed, and the game proceeded without incident.  Minnesota won 13–6, and Iowa star Ozzie Simmons played an injury-free game. Afterward, Minnesota players went out of their way to compliment Simmons, and Simmons praised the Gophers for their clean, hard-fought play. Minnesota went on to win their second straight national championship.

Governor Herring obtained an award-winning prize pig which had been donated by Allen Loomis, the owner of Rosedale Farms near Fort Dodge, Iowa. Dubbed Floyd after Minnesota Governor Olson, the pig was the brother of Blue Boy from Will Rogers' movie State Fair. A few days later, Governor Herring collected "Floyd of Rosedale" and personally walked him into Governor Olson’s carpeted office.

Iowa social crusader Virgil Case swore out a criminal warrant in Des Moines against Governor Herring, alleging that the bet violated Iowa gambling laws. Herring jokingly stated that he had retained Governor Olson as his attorney, who argued that it was not a true bet because Herring did not have a chance of winning it. However, an assistant Iowa attorney general convinced a judge to dismiss on jurisdictional grounds because the bet had been made in Minnesota and Iowa City, beyond the local court's jurisdiction. The Case also argued that the governors were guilty of violating federal gambling laws because the pig had been placed into interstate commerce when Herring made good on the bet, but the U.S. Attorneys declined to prosecute. President Franklin Roosevelt's former son-in-law, Curtis Dall, who attended the 1935 game as a guest of the governors, suggested that they name the pig "New Deal." Herring vetoed that proposal.

Aftermath
Governor Olson later offered Floyd up as the grand prize in a statewide essay-writing contest, which was won by 14-year-old Robert Jones. However,  Floyd ended up on Donald Gjerdrum’s family farm.  Unfortunately, the living “Floyd of Rosedale” wasn’t vaccinated, something that came as a surprise to Gjerdrum’s father, who assumed since it came from the university it would be up-to-date on its shots. Floyd died of cholera just eight months after making headlines, but the “Floyd of Rosedale” trophy tradition lives on.

Since the two schools could not continue wagering a live pig, Governor Olson commissioned Saint Paul sculptor Charles Brioschi to capture Floyd's image. Iowa and Minnesota have played for the Floyd of Rosedale every year since then. The winner of the game is entitled to keep the trophy until the following year's contest.

One of the rivalry's most notable games was in the 1960 NCAA University Division football season when undefeated #3 Minnesota met undefeated #1 Iowa in Minneapolis. The game was for the Big Ten Championship, the 1961 Rose Bowl berth, and the #1 ranking. Minnesota won 27–10.

In 2008, Rivals.com named Floyd of Rosedale the top rivalry trophy in college football.

Game results

See also 
 List of NCAA college football rivalry games
 List of most-played college football series in NCAA Division I

References

External links
 Borzi, Pat. "Trophy Tells a Tale of Rivalry and Race," The New York Times, Friday, November 26, 2010.

College football rivalries in the United States
Iowa Hawkeyes football
Minnesota Golden Gophers football
Big Ten Conference rivalries